Prof Erik Helge Osvald Stensiö  HFRSE (2 October 1891 – 11 January 1984) was a Swedish paleozoologist. He later took his new surname from his place of origin and is occasionally referred to with both names (as Erik Andersson Stensiö, Erik A. Stensiö or Erik A:son Stensiö)

Life

Erik Helge Oswald Andersson, as his original name was, was born in the village of Stensjö by in Döderhult parish in Kalmar County, the son of Johan Fredrik Andersson (d.1907), a farmer, and his wife, Otilia Maria Erlandson (d.1940). He was educated at Linköping Gymnasium. He then studied science at the University of Uppsala, graduating BSc in 1912.

He received his Ph.D. and a docentship in paleontology from Uppsala University in 1921 and became professor and keeper at the Zoopaleontological (later called the Paleozoological) department of the Swedish Museum of Natural History in Stockholm in 1923, a position he held until his retirement in 1959.

Stensiö specialized in the anatomy and evolution of "lower" vertebrates.  His studies of placoderms showed them to be related to modern sharks (though, now, placoderms are considered to be the sister group of all jawed vertebrates, in addition to sharks). His first major work, Triassic fishes from Spitzbergen (part I: Vienna 1921; part II: Stockholm 1925), was based on material collected during his expeditions to Spitzbergen in 1912, 1913, 1915 and 1916. For his work, The Downtonian and Devonian Vertebrates of Spitzbergen, Part I, Stensiö was awarded the Daniel Giraud Elliot Medal from the National Academy of Sciences in 1926.

In 1917 he changed his name from Andersson to Stensiö, adopting the name of his home-town.

He founded the so-called "Stockholm School" in paleozoology, continued notably by his successors in the professorship, Erik Jarvik and Tor Ørvig.

Stensiö was a member of the Royal Swedish Academy of Sciences from 1927 and was elected a Foreign Member of the Royal Society in 1946. He received the Wollaston Medal in 1953, and the Linnean Medal of the Linnean Society of London in 1957. He was awarded the Linnean Society of London's prestigious Darwin-Wallace Medal in 1958.

He died on 11 January 1984 at the Danderyd Hospital in Stockholm.

Family

He was married to Aina Laurell.

References

External links
 
Nordisk familjebok, 2nd ed., vol. 38 
History of the Department of Palaeozoology of the Swedish Museum of Natural History

Swedish paleontologists
20th-century Swedish zoologists
Paleozoologists
1891 births
1984 deaths
Swedish ichthyologists
Members of the Royal Swedish Academy of Sciences
Foreign Members of the Royal Society
Wollaston Medal winners
Uppsala University alumni
People from Kalmar